is a former Japanese football player.

Club statistics

References

External links

Fagiano Okayama

1989 births
Living people
Association football people from Kōchi Prefecture
Japanese footballers
J1 League players
J2 League players
JEF United Chiba players
Fagiano Okayama players
Association football defenders